Beautiful Soul is the debut studio album by American singer/songwriter Jesse McCartney. It was released on September 28, 2004, through Hollywood Records. The album was a success in the United States and Australia, going platinum in both countries, and in Canada, where it was certified gold. It spawned McCartney's first top-20 single, "Beautiful Soul".

Singles 
 "Beautiful Soul" was released on August 12, 2004. Radio Disney aired it earlier before the single was officially released. It peaked at number 16 on the Billboard Hot 100 chart.  It was later certified gold by in the United States and platinum in Australia.
 "She's No You" was released on April 5, 2005. It was not as successful as "Beautiful Soul" peaking at number 91 on the Billboard Hot 100 chart, but it did better at the Pop 100 chart peaking at number 41.
 "Get Your Shine On" was released on September 5, 2005. It was released as the third single of the album in Australia and New Zealand. It was released as a Radio Disney single in early 2005 and is featured in Kim Possible: So The Drama. The song "Why Don't You Kiss Her" is also featured in the film.
 "Because You Live" was released in September 2005. It was released as the third single of the album in North America and Europe. It was released also as a Radio Disney single, and is featured on the Radio Disney Jams, Vol. 7 CD. It was also featured in the end credits of The Princess Diaries 2: Royal Engagement.

Track listings

Charts

Weekly charts

Japan close up edition

Year-end charts

Certifications

Disney Artist Karaoke Series 

Artist Karaoke Series: Jesse McCartney is a karaoke album of songs by Jesse himself, released on September 27, 2005 through Buena Vista. The album features karaoke versions of six tracks from the Beautiful Soul album, as well as two non-album tracks called "Good Life" and "Best Day of My Life".

References 

2004 debut albums
Albums produced by Greg Wells
Albums produced by Matthew Gerrard
Hollywood Records albums
Jesse McCartney albums